Christopher "Chris" Bertram Ronald Barton (21 November 1927 – 18 August 2013) was an Irish rower who competed in the 1948 Summer Olympics for Great Britain.

Barton was born at Celbridge, Kildare, Ireland, the son of Captain Frederick Bertram Barton and Joan Aileen Lecky. He was educated at St Columba's College, Dublin and Jesus College, Cambridge. In 1948, he was a member of the victorious Cambridge crew in the Boat Race. Most of the Cambridge crew of 1948 also rowed for Leander Club at Henley Royal Regatta. The Leander eight were selected to row for Great Britain in the 1948 Summer Olympics and won the silver medal.

See also
List of Cambridge University Boat Race crews
Rowing at the 1948 Summer Olympics

References

1927 births
2013 deaths
Alumni of Jesus College, Cambridge
People educated at St Columba's College, Dublin
Cambridge University Boat Club rowers
British male rowers
Olympic rowers of Great Britain
Rowers at the 1948 Summer Olympics
Olympic silver medallists for Great Britain
Olympic medalists in rowing
Members of Leander Club
Medalists at the 1948 Summer Olympics